Janice Whitby (born October 31, 1950) is a Canadian-born American film and television actress. Her most notable roles includes her debut as a Golddigger, a singing and dancing troupe of young women on The Dean Martin Show. However, she is probably best known for her portrayal of the fembot Katy in the 1970s television series The Bionic Woman.

Early life
Whitby was born in London, Ontario and grew up in Long Island and New York City where she studied ballet.

Career
Whitby made her television debut when she joined "The Golddiggers", an assembled singing and dance troupe that performed regularly on "The Dean Martin Show". She remained with the troupe when they spun off into their own television show, "Chevrolet Presents the Golddiggers". Whitby then  departed the Golddiggers and joined the final season of Rowan & Martin's "Laugh-In" as one of the Beautiful Downtown Beauties.

After "Laugh-In" Whitby landed guest roles on several hit TV series including Baretta, Emergency! and Cannon. However, her biggest and possibly most memorable TV role was guest starring on "The Six Million Dollar Man" and The Bionic Woman three part epic crossover entitled "Kill Oscar". She played the android assailant, Katy, Doctor Franklin's (John Houseman) fembot assistant and operative.  The fembot role earned Whitby ongoing cult status fame among science fiction fans.

Filmography

Films

TV series

TV appearances

References

Additional sources 
 http://www.bionicwomanfiles.com
 http://www.supermegafest.com/

External links

Official Website
 

1950 births
Living people
Actresses from London, Ontario
Actresses from New York City
American film actresses
American television actresses
Canadian film actresses
Canadian television actresses
People from Long Island
20th-century American actresses
21st-century American women